Serviço Público is an album of the Portuguese MC Valete. It was launched in 2006.

Track listing 

Valete albums
2006 albums